Going, Going, Gone is a 2000 alternate history novel by American writer Jack Womack. As the sixth and final installment of his acclaimed Dryco series, the novel was the subject of much anticipation and speculation prior to its release, and was critically well received.

Plot summary
Set in 1968 New York City in an alternate universe to the Dryco universe of the previous five iterations of the series, Going, Going, Gone nevertheless disposes of several of the series' characters in its closing chapters. Its protagonist is Walter Bullitt, an egocentric expert in psychoactive substances who freelances for various branches of the increasingly Nazi-influenced United States government spy apparatus. Though he passes for white, Bullitt is in fact of African-American descent in a USA where, as revealed in previous novels in the Dryco series, the American Civil War never took place. As a result, racial relations in this version of the USA have been much more fraught, with almost all full-blooded African Americans interned and used as slave labor during World War II before being disposed of, and by 1968 even black music has been culturally marginalized. Walter becomes subject to increasingly strange experiences, hearing voices and seeing ghosts from a parallel New York almost a century more advanced than his. Walter is taken to this alternative New York (the primary locale of the previous five Dryco novels) which, after flooding due to the Greenhouse effect, has been moved north, is populated by all races and features in its collection of futuristic wonders television, which never caught on in his world. The novel ends with the two epistemic worlds converging into a New York which is, in the words of critic Paul Dukes a "morally better place than either of the two which composed it".

Critical reception
Going, Going, Gone was well-received critically. Publishers Weekly called it an "intriguing, clever novel", with the potential for crossover appeal as well as for satisfying fans of the series. Biopunk author and reviewer Paul Di Filippo hailed the work as a groundbreaking achievement:

Publishers Weekly compared the novel's prose with that of Anthony Burgess, but conjectured that the vernacular "may annoy some readers". The Magazine of Fantasy and Science Fiction also singled out Womack's prose for attention, commenting:

See also
 The Man in the High Castle, a similar alternate history novel by Philip K. Dick
 Slipstream, a genre which crosses speculative and literary fiction

References

2000 American novels
2000 science fiction novels
Novels by Jack Womack
American alternate history novels
Dryco series
Neo-noir novels
Fiction set in 1968
Novels set in New York City
Voyager Books books